Andrea Carlo Moro (born 24 July 1962) is an Italian linguist, neuroscientist and novelist.

He is currently full professor of general linguistics at the Institute for Advanced Study IUSS Pavia, Italy, founder and former director of NeTS and of the Department of Cognitive Behavioural and Social Sciences. He was professor of at the University of Bologna and at the Università Vita-Salute San Raffaele. He is member of the Academia Europaea and the Pontifical Academy of Fine Arts and Letters of the Virtuosi al Pantheon. His main fields of research are syntax and neurolinguistics. He has pursued at least two distinct lines of research: the theory of syntax and the neurological correlates of syntax with the brain. For the first field, see the critical comments in Graffi (2000), Hale - Keyser (2003), Kayne (2011), Richards (2010) and Chomsky (2013) among others. As for a critical evaluation of the second field see in particular the first chapter of Kandel et al. (2013); see also Kaan, 2002, Marcus 2003 and Newmeyer (2005). By referring to these sources, one can synthetically outline Andrea Moro's work in the two fields as follows.

In the first field, he contributed to the theory of clause structure (in particular with respect to the theory of the copula discovering inverse copular constructions, to the notion of expletive proposing that an element like "there" and its equivalent across languages is a raised expletive predicate rather than an inserted expletive subject, and to the theory of syntactic movement (by proposing a weak version of the theory of antisymmetry, i.e. dynamic antisymmetry) according to which movement is the effect of a symmetry-breaking process in the computational system that underlies syntax. As for the first topic the original reference is the volume "The Raising of Predicates" (1997, Cambridge University Press) - chapter 1 and 2, in particular - which has received more than 1236 citations, according to Google Scholar, whose popularised version is now accessible in English as "A Brief History of the verb to BE" (2017, MIT Press); as for the second, instead, the original reference is the monograph "Dynamic Antisymmetry" (MIT Press) which has received circa 500 references, again according to Google Scholar.

As for the other field, he explored the neurological correlates of artificial languages which do not follow the principles of Universal Grammar providing evidence that Universal Grammar properties cannot be cultural, social or conventional artifacts: in fact, he and the team of people he worked with showed that recursive syntactic rules, that is rules based on recursion selectively activate a neurological network (including Broca's area) whereas non-recursive syntactic rules do not. These discoveries have appeared in a few international Journals, including, for example, Nature Neuroscience (Musso, Moro et al. 2003) or PNAS (Moro 2010): a comprehensive collection of the works in both fields has now become available in the "Routledge Leading Linguist Series" as "The Equilibrium of Human Syntax" (Routledge 2013). He also explored the correlates between the representation of the world in the brain and the structure of syntax, specifically the relationship between sentential negation and the brain) also available in Moro 2013.

In recent papers he took position against the idea that the sequence of human actions can be described as having the same structure as the sequence of words in a well-formed syntactic structure.  Furthermore, Moro pursued the study of the relationship between the brain and language by exploiting electrophysiological measure. The core of the experiment - done in a team with neurosurgeons and electric engineers - consists in comparing the shape of the electric waves of non-acoustic language areas (typically, Broca's area) with the shape of the corresponding sound waves. The result was that not only the shape of the two different waves correlate but they do so also in absence of sound production, that is during inner speech activity, opening the possibility to reading linguistic expression from direct measure of the cortex and skipping the actual utterance of the sentence.  For a non technical synthesis of these discoveries and a critical discussion see "Impossible Languages" which received the honourable mention at the PROSE Awards. For Moro's view on the relationship between mind and language and for evolution of language and related issues see Everaert et al. (2017) and Friederici et al. (2017). A further step into the correlation between grammar and brain electrophysiological activity, Moro participated in a study pursued with the Stereoelectroencephalography (SEEG) tracking different syntactic structures in homophonous phrases un high gamma activity; in other words, this experiment was able to highlight the electrophysiological activity of verb phrases vs. noun phrases while crucially factoring sound out. This was done by exploiting sequences of words with the same sound but different syntactic structure

In his essay "La razza e la lingua" he offers arguments against racism showing that there exist two ideas which look innocuous if considered as separated but which are extremely dangerous if combined: first, that there are languages which are better than others; second, that reality is perceived and though elaborated differently, according to the language one speaks. He highlights that this linguistic racism was at the origin of the myth of Aryan race and the devastating results it had on civilisation.

In his last book "The secrets of words" he discusses with Noam Chomsky some crucial aspects of the relationship between the brain and language. In particular, he notion of impossible languages is highlighted and its impact on neuroscience and epistemology in general is illustrated. The core idea is that humans ignore the only indisputable fact concerning language, namely its linear structure, and compute grammar on the sole basis of hierarchical structures recursively generated. The core argument is taken from those experiments conceived by Moro who designed artificial languages based on linear order and showed that the brain progressively inhibits those networks which are canonically reserved for language.

His first novel is "Il segreto di Pietramala" a thriller concerning a lost language. For this novel, Andrea Moro was awarded the Flaiano Prizes for literature in July 2018.

Selected works

Notes

Bibliography

1962 births
Living people
Linguists from Italy
Syntacticians